Villa Ygatimí is a town founded in 1715 in the Canendiyú department of Paraguay.

Sources 
World Gazeteer: Paraguay – World-Gazetteer.com

Populated places in the Canindeyú Department